The 25 metre muzzle-loading pistol was one of the five sport shooting events on the 1896 Summer Olympics shooting programme. The armament of the American Paine brothers was disqualified because of not being "of the usual calibre" for the event (only pistols of .45 caliber were allowed). With the Paine brothers declining the offer of the Greek shooters to use their pistols, only four shooters entered the fourth shooting event. Three nations were represented. Each shooter fired five strings of six shots at a target 25 metres distant. The competition was held on 11 April and resulted in the top two places going to the Greek marksmen. Nielsen took third place and Merlin did not finish.

Background

This was the first appearance of what would become standardised as the men's ISSF 25 meter rapid fire pistol event, the only event on the 2020 programme that traces back to 1896. The event has been held at every Summer Olympics except 1904 and 1928 (when no shooting events were held) and 1908; it was open to women from 1968 to 1980.

Competition format

The competition had each shooter fire 30 shots, in 5 strings of 6, at a range of 25 metres. Scoring involved multiplying target hits by points scored in each string. Each target had a score of up to 6. The maximum score possible in each string of shots was 216 (6 hits times 6 scores of 6); for the 5-string total, the maximum was 1080 points. The required weapon was a .45 calibre muzzle-loading pistol.

Schedule

The muzzle-loading pistol event was the second shooting event on the sixth day of competition, following the free pistol.

Results

References

  (Digitally available at )
  (Excerpt available at )
 

Men's pistol rapid fire
Men's 1896